Ríoch, early Irish Christian missionary and Saint, .

Biography 

Ríoch operated in the extreme west of Conmhaícne Mara, in what is now County Galway. Surviving traditions state that he was a nephew of Saint Patrick, and an abbot of Inchbofin in Lough Derg. His relics may lie in Salruck cemetery of Little Killary harbour.

His settlements include Oileán Dá Chruinne, Oileán na Naoinri and Oileán an Bhaile Bhig (the three Crump islands), off the southern mouth of Killary Harbour. Oilean Da Chruinne contains the remains of a simple, early Christian oratory on the island's south side, which Ríoch is said to have built. To the immediate east of the church is a small cemetery containing several very ancient headstones, traditionally held to be the graves of forty strangers who accompanied Ríoch from overseas. Their identity is obscure but they are invoked in the Litany of Óengus of Tallaght, dating from the 8th century.

See also 

 Macdara
 Leo of Inis Airc
 Conainne
 Seven Sisters of Renvyle

References 

 A Guide to Connemara's Early Christian Sites, Anthony Previté, Oughterard, 2008. 

Christian clergy from County Galway
5th-century Irish priests
Medieval Irish saints
People of Conmaicne Mara